The 2004 Cronulla-Sutherland Sharks season was the 38th in the club's history. They competed in the NRL's 2004 Telstra Premiership.

Season summary
In the off-season the Sharks signed Stuart Raper as their head coach following the previous season's dismissal of Chris Anderson.

Cronulla did not begin the 2004 season well, losing four or five matches on the trot to be sitting last on the ladder after round five. One early season lowlight was the on-field dismissal of Greg Bird for kneeing Souths' winger Shane Marteene and his subsequent 10-week ban. However, there were some on-field highlights none more so than their round 22 upset of the high-flying Sydney Roosters who were sitting on top of the ladder at the time. They also defeated the likes of the Parramatta Eels at Parramatta Stadium where on their last visit the Sharks were thrashed 74-4 (in fact, Cronulla have not lost at the venue ever since), the Melbourne Storm in Melbourne, the Manly-Warringah Sea Eagles at Brookvale Oval where the Sharks historically have a poor record and the Brisbane Broncos in Brisbane. Otherwise, the season was overall a disappointment; the Sharks missing the finals for the second year in succession however they did improve on their disastrous 12th finish in 2003.

Ladder

References

Cronulla-Sutherland Sharks seasons
Cronulla-Sutherland Sharks season